Ion Voicu (October 8, 1923 – February 24, 1997) was a Romanian violinist and orchestral conductor of Romani ethnicity. In 1969 he founded the award-winning Bucharest Chamber Orchestra, which is now conducted by his son Mădălin Voicu.

Life
Voicu was born in Bucharest, into a family of professional musicians.  At age 6, he had his first music lessons with Constantin Niculescu. At age 14, he entered the Royal Academy of Music in Bucharest, where he studied with George Enescu. After graduating in 1940, he became violinist with the National Radio Orchestra of Romania, where he was noticed by the conductor, Willem Mengelberg; Voicu made his debut as a soloist with the orchestra soon after.  In 1946, he won the first prize at a musical competition organized in Bucharest by George Enescu and Yehudi Menuhin.

In 1949, Voicu first appeared as a soloist with the George Enescu Philharmonic Orchestra under George Georgescu, and he achieved great acclaim as a participant in their 1957 tour of Belgrade; from 1972 to 1982, he was the director of the Philharmonic.

The  in central Bucharest was named after him in 2003.

References

External links
 
  Orchestra Națională Radio

1923 births
1997 deaths
Musicians from Bucharest
Romani violinists
Romanian conductors (music)
Male conductors (music)
Romanian Romani people
Romanian violinists
Male violinists
20th-century conductors (music)
20th-century violinists
20th-century male musicians